Charouine is a town and commune, and capital of Charouine District, in Adrar Province, south-central Algeria. According to the 2008 census it has a population of 11,347, up from 8,678 in 1998, with an annual growth rate of 1.8%.

Geography

Charouine lies at an elevation of  near an oasis, part of the Gourara region of northern Adrar Province.

Climate

Charouine has a hot desert climate (Köppen climate classification BWh), with extremely hot summers and mild winters, and very little precipitation throughout the year.

Transportation

Charouine lies on the N51 national highway that connects the N6 national highway in the southwest to the N1 national highway further east (in southern Ghardaïa Province). The N6 national highway then leads north to Béchar and south to Adrar, while the N1 leads north to Ghardaïa and south to Tamanrasset.

Education

2.8% of the population has a tertiary education, and another 8.4% has completed secondary education. The overall literacy rate is 54.2%, and is 71.8% among males and 35.0% among females.

Localities
As of 1984, the commune was composed of ten localities:

Charouine
Taourirt
Adjir Rharbi
Adjir Chergui
Taguelzi
Tinekham
Bakou
Beni Islem
Asfaou
Tabou

References 

Neighbouring towns and cities

Communes of Adrar Province